Colonae or Kolonai was a town in the ancient Troad near Lampsacus on the Hellespont. It was founded by the Milesians.

References

Populated places in ancient Troad
Former populated places in Turkey
Milesian colonies